is a Sapporo Municipal Subway station in Chūō-ku, Sapporo, Hokkaido, Japan. The station is numbered "N06" for the Namboku Line, and "H07" for the Tōhō Line. The station is connected to the JR Hokkaido Sapporo Station by an underground passage.

Platforms

Namboku Line

Tōhō Line

Surrounding area
 Sapporo Station (JR Hokkaido)
 Sapporo station Bus Terminal
 , (to Hakodate)
 Hokkaido Development Bureau building
 Hokkaido University
 Hokkaido Police Headquarters
 Sapporo Central Post Office
 Sapporo 1 building, (Sapporo Government Office building)
 Sapporo agricultural cooperative association (JA Sapporo), Chuo branch
 Sapporo JR Tower
 Sapporo Stellar Place, shopping mall
 Daimaru store, Sapporo branch
 Sapporo Cinema Frontier
 Sapporo Esta, shopping center
 Tokyu Department store
 Asty 45 building
 Paseo shopping center
 Apia shopping center
 Loft Sapporo store
 Hotel New Otani Sapporo
 North Pacific Bank, Kitashichijo branch
 Hokkaido Bank Sapporo-eki branch
 Mizuho Bank, Sapporo branch
 Aozora Bank, Sapporo Branch
 Aomori Bank, Sapporo Branch
 Suruga Bank, Sapporo Branch
 Daishi Bank, Sapporo Branch
 Hidaka shinkin Bank, Sapporo Branch

See also
 List of railway stations in Japan

References

External links
 Sapporo Subway Stations

Railway stations in Japan opened in 1971
Railway stations in Sapporo
Chūō-ku, Sapporo
Sapporo Municipal Subway